Ali (also Romanized as Ālī) is a village in Azghand Rural District, Shadmehr District, Mahvelat County, Razavi Khorasan Province, Iran. At the 2006 census, its population was 582, in 154 families.

See also 

 List of cities, towns and villages in Razavi Khorasan Province

References 

Populated places in Mahvelat County